Antonio Brivio (Sometimes shown as Marchese Sforza Brivio; 30 January 1905, in Biella, Vercelli, Italy – 29 January 1995) was an Italian bobsledder and racing driver.

Auto racing career

Among his greatest successes in the field of sports cars include a victory in the 24-hour race at Spa-Francorchamps (1932), two victories in the Targa Florio (1933 and 1935) and a win at the Mille Miglia (1936). His greatest success in Grand Prix races were a third place in the Monaco Grand Prix in 1935 and German Grand Prix in 1936. He stopped racing after winning Mille Miglia in his own category in 1952.

After the Second World War, he was Motorsport functionary, he became a member of the Italian Automobile Club and the Federation Internationale de l'Automobile (FIA), where he participated in the launch of the Formula 1 World Championship.

Bobsleigh career
As a bobsledder, Brivio won a bronze medal in the two-man event at the 1935 FIBT World Championships in Igls.

At the 1936 Winter Olympics in Garmisch-Partenkirchen, he finished tenth in the four-man event and 12th in the two-man event.

Racing record

Complete European Championship results
(key) (Races in bold indicate pole position) (Races in italics indicate fastest lap)

References 

1936 bobsleigh two-man results
1936 bobsleigh four-man results
1936 Olympic Winter Games official report. - pp. 415, 418.
Bobsleigh two-man world championship medalists since 1931

1905 births
1995 deaths
Bobsledders at the 1936 Winter Olympics
Italian male bobsledders
Italian racing drivers
Grand Prix drivers
24 Hours of Spa drivers
People from Vercelli
AAA Championship Car drivers
European Championship drivers
Sportspeople from the Province of Vercelli